Rebeka Nirmali (27 November 1964 – 13 August 2014 as රෙබෙකා නිර්මලී) [Sinhala]), also as Rebecca Nirmali, was an actress in Sri Lankan cinema, theater and television. Highly versatile actress with a career spanned for more than 25 years, Nirmali is best known for the role in television serial Weda Hamine.

She died on 13 August 2014 while receiving treatments at Maharagama Cancer Hospital at the age of 49.

Personal life
Nirmali was born on 27 November 1964 in Anuradhapura. She completed education from Nivanthaka Chethiya Vidyalaya, Anuradhapura. She has one daughter - Anne Niroshani, was born in 1987.

Career
She moved to Colombo and started drama career through the stage plays Lokaya Suddai and Sudu Samanalayo in 1987. Then she acted in popular plays Uthure Rahula and Amal Biso as leading actress. Her turning point in acting career came through the 1990 blockbuster television serial Weda Hamine directed by Jayantha Chandrasiri. Then she acted in more than 150 teledramas across many genre.

She started film career with 2003 comedy film Aladinge Weldin directed by Upali Piyaratne. Then she acted in supportive roles in films Ira Sewaya, Uththara and Samanala Sandhawaniya. She also worked in Indian production 'Kangalil Kaithi Seithen directed by Bharathi Raja. Her last appearance in cinema came through Wimal Alahakoon's movie Maw Senehasa.

Notable theater works

 Lokaya Suddai
 Sudu Samanalayo
 Uthure Rahula
 Amal Biso'

Notable television works

 Aaratie Adara Sandawaniya Adarawanthayo Adariye Ahankara Nagare Akala Sandya Ananthaya 
 Anavaratha 
 Angana Angani 
 Anne 
 Aparna Bath Amma Bhavathra Dandubasnamanaya Dangamalla 
 Diya Sayam Diya Sithuvam 
 E brain Gini Weluma 
 Himagira Naga Indikadolla Jeewithaya Sundarai Kadulu Thahanchiya Kapa Nasna Samaya Katu Kurullo 
 Kedella Neha Unusum 
 Kethumathi Neyo 
 Kinduru Adaviya Mage Kaviya Mata Denna 
 Mage Sanda Oba Magi Maya Agni Minipura Hatana Monarathenna Naana Kamare Nagenahira Weralina Asena Nisala Diya Sasala Viya Paasku Pata Veeduru Pingala Danawwa Piniwessa Piyavi Ranthaliya Walawwa Samanala Sihinaya 
 Saranganaa Satharadenek Senpathiyo 
 Sekku Gedara Sihina Kumari Sihina Sithuwam Situ Medura 
 Snehaye Daasi Sohayuro Somapura Weerayo Veda Hamine Wanabime Sirakaruwo Wara Peraliya 
 Wasana Wewa Wassana Sihinaya Waraamal Weda Hamine Wediya RellaAwards and Accolades
Raigam Tele'es

|-
|| 2014 |||  || Raigam Tele'es Merit Award || 

OCIC Awards

|-
|| 2009 ||| Nagenahira Weralina Asena || Best Actress || 

State Drama Festival

|-
|| 2008 ||| Nagenahira Weralina Asena'' || Best Supporting Actress ||

Death
She suffered from cervical cancer since 2007 where the symptoms had come to light in a very short period of time. She was hospitalized in May 2014 and continued treatments for three months. According to Deputy Director of Cancer Hospital, Dr. Wasantha Dissanayaka, when radiotherapy was unsuccessful, Nirmali received chemotherapy treatment.

However, she died on 13 August 2014 while receiving treatments at Maharagama Cancer Hospital. Her remains were kept in a private funeral house in Borella and were then moved to Kala Bhawana on Thursday for final rites. The funeral took place on Thursday evening at the Borella General Cemetery.

On 18 August 2014, an alms-giving was performed at Amarawathi Buddhist Temple in London.

Filmography

References

External links
 Rebecca Nirmali Almsgiving Problem
 පිළිකා රෝගය කල් තියා හඳුනාගෙන නිසි ප්‍රතිකාර ගත්තා නම් රෙබෙකා අදටත් ජීවත් වෙනවා

Sri Lankan film actresses
1964 births
2014 deaths